Henny ter Weer (7 August 1922 – 12 August 2013) was a Dutch fencer. He competed in the individual and team foil and the team sabre events at the 1948 Summer Olympics.

References

External links
 

1922 births
2013 deaths
Dutch male sabre fencers
Olympic fencers of the Netherlands
Fencers at the 1948 Summer Olympics
Sportspeople from Leiden
20th-century Dutch people